Maison Schiaparelli is a haute couture house created by avant-garde Italian fashion designer Elsa Schiaparelli in 1927, and moving towards luxury ready-to-wear after being bought in 2007 by Diego Della Valle.

The house is famous for its eccentric fashions, the use of Surrealism in its collections, its sense of humour, the "shocking Pink" color, gender crossing, and its use of human anatomy depictions, among other unconventional themes.

The style of the house has been described as "hard chic". The company is located at 21 Place Vendôme in Paris, France.

The current creative director has been Daniel Roseberry since 2019.

Under Elsa Schiaparelli (1927–1954)

Elsa Schiaparelli opened an atelier in Paris in 1927. Her early designs were relatively conservative, with a focus on knitwear. Her business grew over time, employing 400 employees by 1932. Already a long-time collaborator with Man Ray, Schiaparelli began further collaborations with artists from the Surrealist movement in the mid-1930s, including Salvador Dalí, Jean Cocteau, and Leonor Fini. During this period, she came into what would become her signature quirky, surrealistic aesthetic. After the Second World War, Schiaparelli's star dimmed, overtaken by new couture designers such as Christian Dior. In 1954, the house declared bankruptcy. Elsa Schiaparelli created a new company in 1957 to sell her perfumes, which is the actual company today. She also went on promoting the perfumes and giving lectures.

Revival

Diego Della Valle, chairman of Tod's Group, purchased the Schiaparelli perfumes company and the rights to the Schiaparelli brand in 2007. Diego Della Valle hired designer Christian Lacroix to create a collection for the house in 2013, though it failed to materialize. Valle later hired designer Marco Zanini as creative director. In 2014, the house presented its first clothes collection since 1954 under Zanini, and re-established its boutique at 21 Place Vendôme, on the first floor of the building which Elsa Schiaparelli bought from Louise Chéruit in 1935. Zanini stepped down in November 2014, after having created two couture collections for the house. In April 2015, Bertrand Guyon was named as the brand's new creative director, and he showed his first collection in July. In April 2019, it was announced that Guyon would be succeeded by Texas-born designer Daniel Roseberry, the first American to head a French couture house. While Guyon's collections were noted for frequent allusions to classic Schiaparelli designs (such as the lobster dress), Roseberry stated that he intended to avoid such literal references, drawing instead on the "spirit" of Elsa Schiaparelli.

The house was accepted into the Chambre Syndicale de la Haute Couture in 2017, becoming one of 15 fashion houses legally permitted to use the designation "haute couture". It had previously been accepted as a "guest member" in 2013.

Under Elsa Schiaparelli, the house was known for its avant-garde, surrealist style. Following the houses's revival, its designers have continued to pay homage to these characteristics, as well as Schiaparelli's signature shocking pink and iconic designs such as her lobster dress.

Under Daniel Roseberry, Schiaparelli has produced a number of high-profile celebrity garments. In December 2020, Kim Kardashian posted images to Instagram of herself wearing a green bodice with prominently sculpted abdominal muscles and large, bauble-like black and gold earrings, all designed by Schiaparelli. The outfit was widely discussed online, with Internet commentators playfully comparing Kardashian's appearance to the Hulk and the Teenage Mutant Ninja Turtles. Similar designs with exaggerated sculpted muscles soon appeared in the house's Spring 2021 haute couture collection, which was shown in January 2021. In January, singer Lady Gaga wore a Schiaparelli ball gown decorated with a golden dove of peace to the inauguration of Joe Biden, where she performed the national anthem. The New York Times and Harper's Bazaar praised Schiaparelli as a breakout star of the 63rd Annual Grammy Awards, in which they dressed Beyoncé and Noah Cyrus.

Artistic Directors 

 2013 : Christian Lacroix
 2013 : Marco Zanini
 2015 : Bertrand Guyon
 2019 : Daniel Roseberry

References

High fashion brands
Haute couture
Clothing companies established in 1927
French companies established in 1927